Couzin Films is a film, television and digital media production company based in Montreal, Quebec, Canada. It was established by Ziad Touma, a Lebanese Canadian film director, producer and screenwriter.

Filmography
2003: Saved by the Belles (aka Échappée belles) directed by Ziad Touma
2005: Webdreams (TV series) directed by Ziad Touma
2007: Birthday Girl directed by Erin Laing
2008: Adam's Wall directed by Michael Mackenzie

See also
Ziad Touma

References

External links
Couzin Films Official website
 Adam's Wall Official Film Website

Film production companies of Canada
Companies based in Montreal